Sylvia Lake is a lake located by Balmat, New York. Fish species present in the lake are largemouth bass, smallmouth bass, lake trout, rainbow trout, landlocked salmon, and black bullhead. There is a state owned beach launch on Route 812 between Fowler and Balmat.

References

Lakes of St. Lawrence County, New York
Lakes of New York (state)